Haematobia is a genus of biting true flies of the family Muscidae.

Species
H. exigua Meijere, 1906
H. irritans (Linnaeus, 1758)
H. minuta (Bezzi, 1892)
H. potans (Bezzi, 1907)
H. schillingsi (Grünberg, 1906)
H. spinigera Malloch, 1932
H. thirouxi (Roubaud, 1906)
H. titillans (Bezzi, 1907)

References

Muscidae
Diptera of Europe
Diptera of North America 	
Diptera of Africa
Diptera of Asia
Muscoidea genera
Taxa named by Amédée Louis Michel le Peletier
Taxa named by Jean Guillaume Audinet-Serville